Racial Harmony Day is a day in Singapore to celebrate its success as a racially harmonious nation. It is observed on the 21st of July every year, with most activities organised by schools and grassroots organisations, including religious groups.

History
First launched in 1997 by the Ministry of Education in schools, the event commemorates the 1964 race riots which took place on 21 July 1964 when Singapore was still part of Malaysia (1963–1965), in which 22 people lost their lives and hundreds were severely injured. There were numerous other communal riots and incidents throughout the 50s and 60s leading to and after Singapore's independence in August 1965.

Racial Harmony Day has since expanded its reach. Today, grassroots organisations such as the People’s Association and the Community Development Councils are also involved.

Schools

On this day, students in schools across the nation are encouraged to be dressed in other cultures' traditional costumes such as the Cheongsam, the Baju Kurung and Saree. Traditional delicacies are a feature of the celebration. Traditional games such as five stones, zero points, and hopscotch are played, where inter-class competitions are sometimes organised. Some activities introduced by schools include designing Kolams and Maruthani and Henna hand painting. this

Harmony Games
The event is an annual racial community effort to strengthen ties among Singaporeans of different ethnic communities to get together and celebrate diversity.

Declaration

Schools are also encouraged to recite a Declaration of Religious Harmony during the celebrations. In the week of 21 July, representatives from the Inter-Religious Harmony Circle (IRHC) comprising various religious groups also get together to pledge their support and to promote the Declaration.

See also 
 1964 race riots in Singapore
 Maria Hertogh riots
 13 May Incident
 Total Defence Day

References

Singaporean culture
Education in Singapore
July observances